Teuchothrips is a genus of thrips in the family Phlaeothripidae.

Species
 Teuchothrips acripilus
 Teuchothrips ater
 Teuchothrips badiipennis
 Teuchothrips brevis
 Teuchothrips burroughsi
 Teuchothrips circinans
 Teuchothrips clavipilus
 Teuchothrips cleistanthi
 Teuchothrips connatus
 Teuchothrips disjunctus
 Teuchothrips eugeniae
 Teuchothrips froggatti
 Teuchothrips kraussi
 Teuchothrips longiseta
 Teuchothrips longus
 Teuchothrips melaleucae
 Teuchothrips minor
 Teuchothrips noumeaensis
 Teuchothrips ornatus
 Teuchothrips pacificus
 Teuchothrips simplicipennis
 Teuchothrips sodalis
 Teuchothrips vicinus

References

Phlaeothripidae
Thrips
Thrips genera